Wayne S. Ewing (February 14, 1929 – March 19, 2010) was a former member of the Pennsylvania State Senate, serving from 1967 to 1976.

References

Republican Party Pennsylvania state senators
1929 births
2010 deaths